is the 2nd single by Berryz Kobo × Cute (pronounced Berikyū), a collaboration unit between the Japanese idol groups Berryz Kobo and Cute. The single was first released for paid download on April 28, 2012; the CD single was released on June 20, 2012.

Background 
The title song is a mix of two previously published songs, Berryz Kobo's "Because Happiness" and Cute's "Shiawase no Tochū" from their 2012 albums. Both tracks were intentionally composed and produced by Tsunku to form a new song when played simultaneously. The trick was originally scheduled to be announced at a summer Hello! Project concert, but was uncovered by fans in mid-April. The song became a hot topic on the Internet, and a set of the three tracks, "Because Happiness", "Shiawase no Tochū ", and "Chō Happy Song", was hastily released as a digital download single on April 28.

The CD single will be released on June 20. It will contain a new arrangement version of the title track. The CD single will be available in 5 versions: Regular Edition and Limited Editions A, B, C, and D. The Limited Editions A and B will include a bonus DVD; all the other editions will be CD-only. As usual, all the limited editions will be shipped sealed and will contain a serial-numbered entry card for the lottery to win a ticket to one of the single's launch events.

Track listing 
All songs written and composed by Tsunku.

Regular Edition, Limited Editions A, B

Limited Edition C

Limited Edition D

Charts

References

External links 
 Berikyū - Berryz Kobo × Cute - Chō Happy Song - Official page for the single
 CD single, profile on the Up-Front Works official website
 CD single, profile in Berryz Kobo's discography on the Hello! Project official website
 CD single, profile in Cute's discography on the Hello! Project official website
 Digital download single from April 28 on iTunes
 Berryz Kobo × Cute - Tsunku's official blog

2012 singles
Japanese-language songs
Cute (Japanese idol group) songs
Berryz Kobo songs
Songs written by Tsunku
Song recordings produced by Tsunku
Zetima Records singles
2012 songs